Sharkrunners season 1 was a game created by area/code for the Discovery Channel as part of the channel's 20th year of Shark Week. The game used satellite tracking of six great white sharks off the coast of California. Users were able to take control of research vessels to gather, in real-time, information on the sharks, while trying to earn funding.

Sharkrunners season 2 used satellite tracking of ten tiger sharks and ten grey reef sharks off the northern coast of Queensland, Australia.

Sharkrunners was removed from Discovery Channel online in July 2011.

Institutions
When creating a character, the player is given the choice of three institutions to join:
- The International Marine Observation Project (I.M.O.P.): a high-tech research institute run by no-nonsense marine scientists looking for hard data
- The Piermont Group: a media-savvy philanthropic organization that is interested equally  in scientific data and dramatic images
- Friends of the Ichtheological Nation (FIN): a hard-core ecological activist group devoted to protecting and preserving sharks at any cost

Sharks
Season 1 default names are given, in addition to their code numbers, for the six sharks in the game, though the player may rename them . They are as follows:

Season 2 default names for tiger sharks' are given, in addition to their code numbers, to the ten sharks currently in the game, though the player may rename them. They are as follows:

- Lola has become unable to be tracked due to loss of tag or the tag has stopped transferring data.
- Rainebow2 has become unable to be tracked due to loss of tag or the tag has stopped transferring data.
- On 8/5/08, Lola and Rainebow2's data was recovered. They are able to be tracked once again.
- Since 1/3/09, Lola has become unable to be tracked due to loss of tag or the tag has stopped transferring data.
-On 1/12/09, Lola's data was recovered. They are able to be tracked once again.

Season 2 default names for grey reef sharks' are given, in addition to their code numbers, to the ten sharks currently in the game, though the player may rename them. They are as follows:

Encounters
Danger levels: very high (VH), high (H), medium (M), low (L), very low (VL)
Data quality levels: very high (VH), high (H), medium (M), low (L), very low (VL)
Observation types: (HA) habitat and environment, (HE) health and biology, (SE) senses and perception, (AG) aggression v. humans, (RE) reproductive, (SO) social, (FE) feeding and hunting

In season 2, the seal decoy is replaced with a turtle decoy, and the attached camera has been replaced by the "SharkCam".

Ports
Season 1
Other than name and location, all three ports are identical except for crew candidates available for hiring. They offer four main services: selling gas, boat upgrades, equipment, and crew for hire. The ports from north to south are:
 Monterey
 San Luis Obispo
 San Diego

Season 2
 Port Moresby
 Bamaga
 Lakefield

Bonus location - achieve research rank level of 10 in the Sharkrunners HQ page
 Hamamas Beach Port

Accomplishments
Season 1

Season 2

Additionally, research accomplishments can be made, some of which can assist in the completion of The Good Life goal for Sharkrunners season 2. Research projects can be initiated on a player's Sharkrunners HQ profile and will result in 450 - 950 (?) research points per goal reached. The ultimate goal is 105,000 points to accomplish the level 20 research requirement in order to have a gold border around an individual player's flag.

Equipment

Boats
There are four boats in the game. Each can have an engine refit (increases both cruising and top speed by 10%) and upgraded fuel tanks (increases fuel capacity by 20%).

Equipment

Specialists
Season 2
These are the seven specialist needed for the Nerd Patrol Achievement

External links
 Fan site
 Website of area/code, the game's creators

Discovery Channel original programming